Harry and Meghan may refer to the following:

Prince Harry, Duke of Sussex, and Meghan, Duchess of Sussex
Wedding of Prince Harry and Meghan Markle, in 2018
Harry & Meghan: A Royal Romance, a 2018 U.S. television film
Harry & Meghan: Becoming Royal, a 2019 U.S. television film
Harry & Meghan: Escaping the Palace, a 2021 U.S. television film
Harry & Meghan, a 2022 Netflix docuseries